Raji–Raute is a branch of the Sino-Tibetan language family that includes the three closely related languages, namely Raji, Raute, and Rawat. They are spoken by small hunter-gatherer communities in the Terai region of Nepal and in neighboring Uttarakhand, India.

Like some other Tibeto-Burman languages, Raji-Raute languages have voiceless sonorants.

Classification
Raute and Rawat are closely related; Raji is more distantly related. Fortier classifies the Raji-Raute languages as follows. Note that language varieties that classify within the Rawat subgroup are known by various names; Raute of Dadeldhura/Darchula is taxonomically a Rawat language, and is not to be confused with Raute proper.

Raji–Raute
Raute–Rawat
Raute (nomadic groups)
Rawat
Rajwar (spoken in Khirdwari)
Rawat
Rawat (also known as Ban Raji)
Raute of Dadeldhura/Darchula
Raji
Naukule
Bandale, Purbia

Schorer (2016)
Schorer (2016:293) classifies Raji–Raute as part of his newly proposed Greater Magaric group.
Greater Magaric
Dura
Dura
Tandrange
Magaric: Kham, Magar
Chepangic-Raji
Chepangic: Chepang, Bhujel
Raji-Raute

Fortier (2012)
A database of 700 words for items from households of Raute and Ban Rawat speakers (Fortier 2012) indicates a largely Sino-Tibetan language ancestry. Deep Root items include 58 words of Sino-Tibetan origin and 7 of Austroasiatic origin. Proto-family items include 281 morphemes of Proto-Tibeto-Burman origin. Meso-root, or subfamily items include 34 words of Proto-Kuki-Chin origin, 23 of Proto-Tani origin, 6 of Proto-Tangkulic origin, and 1 of Northern Chin origin. The database omits most loans of Indo-Aryan origin although 43 items were of Sanskrit origin. Work remains on identifying etymologies of the remaining 247 items in the Raute–Rawat database.

Distribution
Raji-Raute varieties are spoken in the following areas of Nepal and India.
Dadeldhura/Darchula Raute: Darchula District and Dadeldhura District, Nepal
Ban Raji/Rawat: Pithoragarh District, Uttarakhand, India
Khirdwari Rajwar: Champawat District, Uttarakhand, India
Raute: nomadic, 10 districts of western Nepal
Bandale Raji: Surkhet District and Kailali District, Nepal
Naukule Raji: Kailali District, Nepal
Purbia Raji: Bardia District, Nepal

Vocabulary
The comparative vocabulary lists of Raji and Raute below are from Rastogi & Fortier (2005). Rastogi & Fortier (2005) also provide Purbia Raji and Janggali Raute forms.

Swadesh list
The following is a 100-word Swadesh list from Rastogi & Fortier (2005).

Body parts
Rastogi & Fortier (2005) list the following body part terms.

Footnotes

References
 George van Driem (2001) Languages of the Himalayas: An Ethnolinguistic Handbook of the Greater Himalayan Region. Brill.
Fortier, Jana (2012) "Annotated Dictionary of Raute and Rawat Languages" 
Rastogi, Kavita and Jana Fortier. 2005. Daa, Nii, Sum/Khung: Comparative Vocabulary of the West-Central Himalayan Languages Rawati (Raji) and Khamci (Raute). Indian Linguistics 66. 105-115.

Further reading
Fortier, Jana. 2019. A Comparative Dictionary of Raute and Rawat: Tibeto-Burman Languages of the Central Himalayas. Harvard Oriental Series 88. Cambridge, MA: Harvard University Press. 
Krishan, Shree. 2003. Darma, Chaudangsi, and Raji. In: Randy J. LaPolla (ed.), Tibeto-Burman Languages of Uttar Pradesh, pp. 139-272.

 
Languages of India